Seaway is a Canadian drama series that aired on CBC Television for the 1965–1966 season. The series was a Seaway Films production in collaboration with the UK's ATV, with production money provided by the CBC. It was presented by ASP and distributed internationally by ITC Entertainment (for international screenings ITC replaced the theme music by John Bath with another composition by Edwin Astley, and prepared a different title sequence).

Although officially Canadian, many of the show's writers and directors were American (as was the series creator/script supervisor Abraham Polonsky), with some British contributors as well (such as Ian McLellan Hunter and Donald James). It was the most expensive series produced in Canada to that time with a total cost of $3 million ($ million today), and although it did well enough for the CBC in terms of viewers a hoped-for sale to American network television never happened because the series, with the exceptions of the two-part episodes "Don't Forget to Wipe the Blood Off" and "Gunpowder and Paint," was shot in black and white and US network shows by that time were, with a few exceptions, in color.

Overview
Seaway followed the adventures of Nick King (played by Stephen Young) who works as a ship owners' agent, investigating crimes involving shipping. He is assisted by Department of Transport agent Leslie Fox (Austin Willis), and the special police force patrolling the Saint Lawrence Seaway.  Episodes were filmed in various locations along the seaway, primarily Toronto and Montreal.  They were generally set in Canada, although the two-parter "Gunpowder and Paint" was partially set in Cleveland (though filmed in Toronto.)

Cast
Stephen Young as Nick King
Austin Willis as Admiral Fox
Cec Linder as Inspector Provist

Notable guest stars included Canadian actor Gordon Pinsent, Canada-based British actor Barry Morse (who was appearing in The Fugitive at the time), Sally Kellerman, Faye Dunaway in one of her first screen appearances, Lynda Day George, Susan Oliver, and Richard Thomas.

Episodes
This list is in broadcast order, as broadcast on the CBC according to TV listings guides. A pair of episodes (Don't Forget to Wipe the Blood Off) were edited together into a feature film entitled Affair with a Killer.

*Episodes made in color

The transmission and/or production order of the following episodes is unknown. It can be assumed these episodes slot into the gaps in the above list.

 "Nothing but a Long Goodbye"
 "The Sparrows"
 "A Medal for Mirko"
 "Abraham's Hand"

International broadcast
The Australian rights are held by the Nine Network who, over many decades, have shown numerous repeats in non-peak viewing times. Since 2012 and continuing in 2018, there have been numerous showings in the early hours of the morning on Gem, a Nine Network digital outlet, sometimes twice per morning. Until November 2017, the Seaway repeats alternated with re-screenings of two British series Gideon's Way and Danger Man. In early 2022 they were broadcast around midday.

References

External links

 
 Queen's University Directory of CBC Television Series (Seaway archived listing link via archive.org)
 

1965 Canadian television series debuts
1966 Canadian television series endings
1960s Canadian drama television series
Black-and-white Canadian television shows
CBC Television original programming
Television series by ITC Entertainment
English-language television shows